Gabriele Huemer (born 18 March 1964) is an Austrian Paralympic alpine skier. She represented Austria in Paralympic Alpine skiing at the 1994 Winter Paralympics, and 2002 Winter Paralympics. She won five medals: two gold medals, two silver, and one bronze.

Career 
At the 1994 Winter Paralympics in Lillehammer, Norway, Huemer competed in two alpine skiing events, winning gold in the super-G B1-2, with a time of 1:18.89,  and silver in the giant slalom, B1-2 (with a time of 2:52.48 she placed behind her compatriot Elisabeth Kellner in 2:50.31 and ahead of the Swedish athlete Åsa Bengtsson in 3:05.11).

At the 2002 Winter Paralympics in Salt Lake City, Huemer won gold in the slalom B2-3, with a time of 1:50.74), a silver in the super-G B2-3,  and a bronze in downhill B2-3. She also competed in the giant slalom B2-3, where she did not finish.

References 

1964 births
Living people
Paralympic alpine skiers of Austria
Austrian female alpine skiers
Alpine skiers at the 1994 Winter Paralympics
Alpine skiers at the 2002 Winter Paralympics
Medalists at the 1994 Winter Paralympics
Medalists at the 2002 Winter Paralympics
Paralympic gold medalists for Austria
Paralympic silver medalists for Austria
Paralympic bronze medalists for Austria